Vlajko Stojiljković (13 March 1937 – 13 April 2002) was a Serbian politician. He served as the Minister of Internal Affairs in the Government of Serbia from 1997 to 2000. He also served as the Deputy Prime Minister of Serbia from 1997 to 1998. He was a member of the League of Communists of Yugoslavia and the Socialist Party of Serbia from its founding until his death in 2002.

On 24 May 1999, he was accused with crimes against humanity and violations of the laws or customs of war.

Death
On 11 April 2002, the day the Law on Cooperation with the Hague Tribunal was passed, he shot himself on the steps of the House of the National Assembly of Serbia in Belgrade. 

In his farewell letter given to the Serbian Radical Party MP Filip Stojanović and read by Aleksandar Vučić in front of the media, he stated that he's: "protesting against the members of the puppet regime of the Democratic Opposition of Serbia ... because of the destruction of state with the participation of the biggest enemy of our people Javier Solana, the wanton extermination of the Constitution and laws of this country, the policy of treason and capitulation, the loss of national dignity, the destruction of the economy and the bringing of millions of citizens into the social misery..." 

On 5 October 2000, during the demonstration against Slobodan Milošević, Stoiljković allegedly ordered mass killing of protesters. Police allegedly refused to use Rocket-propelled grenade against protesters' buses.

His advocate at the time Branimir Gugl stated: "Stojiljković's suicide is the first and most drastic consequence of the adoption of the Law on Cooperation with the Hague Tribunal." Stojiljković died, two  days later, on 13 April 2002.

His son  also committed suicide in 2004.

See also
 War crimes in the Kosovo War
 Operation Horseshoe

References

External links 
 Optužnica za ratne zločine 
 Vlajko Stojiljković at trialinternational.org

1937 births
2002 deaths
Politicians from Smederevo
Politicians from Požarevac
Serbia and Montenegro politicians
Interior ministers of Serbia
Serbian politicians who committed suicide
Suicides by firearm in Serbia
University of Belgrade Faculty of Law alumni
Burials in Požarevac